Ken Fletcher (31 December 1931 – 13 October 2011) was an English footballer, who played as a full back in the Football League for Chester.

References

Chester City F.C. players
1931 births
2011 deaths
Everton F.C. players
Prescot Cables F.C. players
Association football fullbacks
English Football League players
Footballers from Liverpool
English footballers